Monograptus is a genus of graptolites in the order Graptoloidea. This particular genus is the last stage of the graptoloid evolution before its extinction in the early Devonian. A characteristic of the genus includes one uniserial stipes with very elaborate thecae. This particular genus contains large number of graptolite species and may not be monophyletic.

Biostratigraphic significance 
The International Commission on Stratigraphy (ICS) has assigned the First Appearance Datum (FAD) of Monograptus uniformis as the defining biological marker for the start of the Lochkovian, 419.2 ± 3.2 million years ago, the earliest stage of the Devonian. ICS has assigned the FAD of Monograptus parultimus defining biological marker for the start of the Pridoli epoch, 423.0 ± 2.3 million years ago, of Monograptus turriculatus (together with the replacement of the brachiopod Eocoelia intermedia with E. curtisi) for the start of the Telychian, 438.5 ± 1.1 million years ago, and of Monograptus austerus sequens for the start of the Aeronian, 440.8 ± 1.2 million years ago, all stages of the Silurian.

References

External links
Photo; Article english.fossiel.net—"graptolite Monograptus from Bornholm, Denmark"

Graptolite genera
Silurian animals
Graptoloidea
Index fossils
Fossils of Algeria
Fossils of Sweden
Paleozoic life of British Columbia
Paleozoic life of the Northwest Territories
Paleozoic life of Nunavut
Paleozoic life of Quebec
Paleozoic life of Yukon